Motion is the fourth studio album by Scottish DJ and record producer Calvin Harris, released on 31 October 2014 by Fly Eye and Columbia Records. The album includes collaborations with Ellie Goulding, Gwen Stefani, John Newman, Tinashe, Big Sean, Alesso, R3hab, Ummet Ozcan, Firebeatz, Hurts, Haim and All About She.

The album received mixed responses from critics. Motion debuted at number two on the UK Albums Chart, with 37,325 copies sold in its first week. It debuted at number five on the Billboard 200 in the United States, and became Harris's second consecutive number-one album on the Dance/Electronic Albums chart. The album's first three singles—"Under Control", "Summer" and "Blame"—all topped the UK Singles Chart. Other singles released from the album include "Outside", "Open Wide" and "Pray to God".

Background
The album's title, artwork and release date were officially revealed on 25 September 2014. On 5 October, Harris took to Twitter to announce a list of collaborators on the album, including Ellie Goulding, Ummet Ozcan, Big Sean, R3hab, Gwen Stefani, Haim, Tinashe and All About She.

Singles
"Under Control", a collaborative track with Swedish DJ Alesso and English duo Hurts, was released on 7 October 2013 as the first single from Motion. The song debuted at number one on the UK Singles Chart, and charted inside the top 10 in Finland, Ireland, Norway and Sweden.

"Summer" was released on 14 March 2014 as the album's second single. It reached number one in the United Kingdom and Ireland, and charted within the top five in countries such as Australia, Canada, Germany, Norway and Sweden. It also became Harris's highest-charting solo single on the Billboard Hot 100 at the time, peaking at number seven.

"Blame" features vocals from English singer John Newman and was released on 7 September 2014 as the album's third single. The song earned Harris his fifth number-one single as a lead artist (and seventh in total) on the UK Singles Chart. Internationally, "Blame" peaked at number one in Finland, Norway and Sweden, and reached number 19 on the Billboard Hot 100.

"Outside" was released on 20 October 2014 as the album's fourth single, featuring English singer Ellie Goulding. The single reached number six on the UK Singles Chart. It also peaked at number one in Germany and Finland, while charting inside the top five in Ireland, Norway and Sweden, the top 10 in Australia and New Zealand, and the top 30 in the United States.

"Open Wide", which features Big Sean, was originally released as the second promotional single from the album on 27 October 2014. It is a vocal mix of the instrumental track "C.U.B.A", which was released on Beatport on 21 July 2014. The song peaked at number 23 on the UK Singles Chart. "Open Wide" was sent to rhythmic contemporary radio in the United States on 27 January 2015 as the album's fifth single.

"Pray to God", featuring American band Haim, was released on 6 March 2015 as the album's sixth and final single overall. The song reached number 10 on the Australian Singles Chart and number 35 on the UK Singles Chart.

Promotional singles and other songs
"Slow Acid" was released as the first promotional single from the album on 15 October 2014. The song reached number 86 on the UK Singles Chart.

"Burnin'", a collaboration with Dutch DJ R3hab, was released as the album's second promotional single on 29 October 2014 through Beatport.

"Overdrive", a collaboration with Dutch DJ Ummet Ozcan, was released as the album's third promotional single on 22 December 2014 through Beatport. It was renamed to "Overdrive (Part 2)" because it was slightly remixed.

Despite not being released as a single, "Faith" reached number 31 on the US Hot Dance/Electronic Songs chart, number 33 on the UK Dance Singles Chart and number 178 on the French Singles Chart.

Critical reception

Motion received mixed reviews from music critics. At Metacritic, which assigns a normalised rating out of 100 to reviews from mainstream publications, the album received an average score of 57, based on nine reviews. Glenn Gamboa of Newsday praised the album as an "EDM winner" and was complimentary of songs such as "Outside", "Pray to God" and "Open Wide". Kyle Anderson of Entertainment Weekly wrote, "The best tracks on Motion [...] focus more on high-caliber vocals than on booty-blasting low end", adding that Harris's "largely straight-ahead approach will rankle EDM devotees who are searching for boundary-busting beats, but he's taking his chances with the most unpredictable technology of all: the human voice." Mikael Wood of the Los Angeles Times opined, "For all the intensity he delivers on Motion, Harris is best [...] when he dials down the jock-jam vibe, as in 'Love Now' [...] and 'Ecstasy'". Wood also praised the guest appearances of Gwen Stefani and Haim, stating that "the presence of those strong women does wonders for Harris' amped-up music. They bring out the man, not the meathead, in the machine." Elysa Gardner of USA Today remarked that "Harris' textural savvy is evident throughout, if his methods are hardly novel."

At Billboard, Megan Buerger commented that although the album is "packed with all-too-predictable crowd-pleasers", it "also has a few surprises [...] that suggest [Harris is] a more dynamic producer than he lets on, one with a true appreciation of dance music's purer forms." Despite noting that "there are occasional surprises" on the album, Caroline Sullivan of The Guardian concluded, "The big pop hooks and breakdowns are here, but there is little sense of Harris's personality." AllMusic's Heather Phares was unimpressed, writing, "Despite a few bright moments, Motion is disappointingly bland—especially since Harris has made plenty of memorable electro-pop before and after his EDM makeover." Similarly, Brent Faulkner of PopMatters found Motion to be "somewhat of a scattered album with some shining moments", but wrote that "Harris' production is sound and the material is pleasant if nothing more. It's not the biggest triumph of the year by any means, but Motion does whet the palate." Nick Murray of Rolling Stone expressed that "Harris is updating his EDM template rather than coming close to reimagining it", while citing "It Was You", "Dollar Signs" and "Summer" as "the kind of superglossy, unexceptionally fun tunes that kids will dance to and rebel against in equal numbers." Slant Magazines James Rainis complimented songs like "Blame" and "Together", but criticised "Faith" and "Open Wide", commenting, "Regrettably, such ear candy [as 'Blame'] is few and far between."

Rolling Stone included Motion at number 15 on their list of the "20 Best Pop Albums of 2014".

Commercial performance
Motion debuted at number two on the UK Albums Chart, selling 37,325 copies in its first week. In the United States, it entered the Billboard 200 at number five with first-week sales of 35,000 copies, marking Harris's first top-10 album on the chart, as well as his best sales week in the US. It also became his second album to top the Billboards Dance/Electronic Albums chart, following 18 Months (2012). As of January 2015, the album had sold 66,000 copies in the US. The album debuted at number two on the Canadian Albums Chart with 7,300 copies sold in its first week.

Track listing

Notes
  signifies an additional producer

Personnel
Credits adapted from the liner notes of Motion.

Musicians

 Calvin Harris – all instruments ; vocals ; arrangement ; instruments 
 Theo Hutchcraft – vocals 
 John Newman – vocals 
 Vanya Taylor – vocals 
 Ellie Goulding – vocals 
 Firebeatz – all instruments 
 Ummet Ozcan – all instruments 
 Haim – vocals 
 Danielle Haim – guitars 
 Ariel Rechtshaid – keyboards 
 Big Sean – vocals 
 Gwen Stefani – vocals 
 R3hab – all instruments 
 Tinashe – vocals

Technical

 Calvin Harris – production ; mixing ; engineering ; mastering 
 Mike Marsh – mastering 
 Alesso – production, mixing, engineering 
 Arthur Indrikovs – vocal engineering 
 Seb Berrios – additional vocal engineering 
 Simon Davey – mastering 
 Firebeatz – production 
 Ummet Ozcan – production, mixing 
 Ariel Rechtshaid – additional production 
 Manny Marroquin – mixing 
 Chris Galland – mixing assistance 
 Ike Schultz – mixing assistance

Charts

Weekly charts

Year-end charts

Certifications

Release history

Notes

References

2014 albums
Albums produced by Ariel Rechtshaid
Albums produced by Calvin Harris
Calvin Harris albums
Columbia Records albums